Justyn Cassell (born 25 May 1967) is a former a rugby union player who played for a number of top tier English club sides but was also known as an excellent Rugby Sevens player and in this capacity was capped for England and was part of the team that won the 1993 Rugby World Cup Sevens.

Early life
Cassell was born in Reading, Berkshire and was educated at Dulwich College in London.

Rugby union career
Cassell was a back-row forward who played his club rugby for a number of English club sides, his first major club being Saracens. He later joined Harlequins and then Northampton. His time with Northampton saw him into the era of the newly formed Premiership. However, his playing days were cut short in 1998 due to a knee injury.

At an international level he represented the England A squad, but was never capped as a full international. As an exponent of the Sevens form of the game he was selected for the 1993 England squad in the Sevens World Cup and he came on for Tim Rodber during the final, from which England emerged victorious.

Ten years later, Cassell played for a team of Latter Day Saints, a Northampton Saints veterans squad, who took on the Esher Expendables.

Career outside rugby
Cassell went into marketing communications operating out of Piccadilly, London.

References

External links
Profile on ESPN Scrum

1967 births
Living people
England international rugby sevens players
English rugby union players
People educated at Dulwich College
Rugby union players from Reading, Berkshire